

Final Six (Barcelona)
Piscines Bernat Picornell, Barcelona, Spain

Quarter-finals

5th place

Semi-finals

Third place

Final

Final standings

Awards

See also
2013–14 LEN Euro Cup

External links
LEN Champions League (official website)

LEN Champions League seasons
Champions League
2013 in water polo
2014 in water polo